Pinart may refer to:

 People
 Alphonse Pinart (1852–1911), French explorer, philologist, and ethnographer
 Claude Pinart (died 1605), Secretary of State under King Henry III

 Places
 Fenart, Isfahan County, Iran